Grey Timothy is a 1913 sports thriller novel by the British writer Edgar Wallace. Brian Pallard, an Australian gambler arrives in Britain clashes with a rival English aristocrat at the racetrack.

Adaptation
In 1919, it was adapted into a British silent film Pallard the Punter starring Heather Thatcher and Lionel d'Aragon.

References

Bibliography
 Clark, Neil. Stranger than Fiction: The Life of Edgar Wallace, the Man Who Created King Kong. Stroud, Gloucs: The History Press, 2015.
 Goble, Alan. The Complete Index to Literary Sources in Film. Walter de Gruyter, 1999.

1913 British novels
Novels by Edgar Wallace
British thriller novels
British sports novels
British novels adapted into films
Horse racing novels